Sacred Heart Roman Catholic Church is a Roman Catholic Church in Ozora in Ste. Genevieve County, Missouri.

History

The parish was formed in 1899.

References

Roman Catholic churches completed in 1899
Churches in the Roman Catholic Archdiocese of St. Louis
Romanesque Revival church buildings in Missouri
19th-century Roman Catholic church buildings in the United States